Rukmini Devi Public School (or RDPS) is a school located in north-west Delhi, India. The building was constructed over a plot area of 3.4 acres allotted by the Delhi Development Authority, New Delhi. The school is recognized by the Directorate of Education, government of NCT, Delhi and is affiliated to the Central Board of Secondary Education (CBSE), an autonomous body of HRD, government of India up to 10+2 level, (Affiliation No. 2730165).

The school is involved in students & staff exchange programmes with schools in countries such as UK, Germany, France, Italy, and Singapore. The students under these exchange programmes work on projects related to socio-economic, cultural, historical, and geographical structure of the country.

The school has been accredited with the International Award, by the British Council.

External links 
Official website

Schools in Delhi
North West Delhi district